Donald Martel is a Canadian politician, who was elected to the National Assembly of Quebec in the 2012 provincial election. He represents the electoral district of Nicolet-Bécancour as a member of the Coalition Avenir Québec.

Martel has a Bachelor's Degree in administration. He was selected as both secretary-treasurer and director general of the Nicolet-Yamaska Regional County Municipality (MRC) in 1994, and continues to hold the first position as of 2009. He has also been the responsable administratif for the Centre local de développement (CLD) in Nicolet-Yamaska since 1998. Between 1999 and 2003, he was president of l’Association des directeurs généraux des MRC du Québec. He has also taken part in a local campaign against cannabis.

Martel ran as a Parti Québécois candidate in Nicolet-Yamaska in the 2007 election, finishing second with 7,455 votes (28.32%) against Action démocratique du Québec candidate Éric Dorion. He resigned as president of the local Parti Québécois association in April 2008, arguing that his civic duties were inconsistent with partisan political activity.

Electoral record

|- style="background-color:white"
! style="text-align:right;" colspan=3 |Total valid votes
! style="text-align:right;" |26,323
! style="text-align:right;" |98.73
! style="text-align:right;" |
|- style="background-color:white"
! style="text-align:right;" colspan=3 |Rejected and declined votes
! style="text-align:right;" |339
! style="text-align:right;" |1.27
! style="text-align:right;" |
|- style="background-color:white"
! style="text-align:right;" colspan=3 |Turnout
! style="text-align:right;" |26,662
! style="text-align:right;" |77.73
! style="text-align:right;" |
|- style="background-color:white"
! style="text-align:right;" colspan=3 |Electors on the lists
! style="text-align:right;" |34,301
! style="text-align:right;" |
! style="text-align:right;" |

References

External links
 

Living people
1964 births
Coalition Avenir Québec MNAs
Université du Québec à Trois-Rivières alumni
People from Shawinigan
21st-century Canadian politicians